Judges who have served on the Supreme Court of Queensland, include:
 Chief Justice of Queensland
 Judges of the Court of Appeal
 Judges

Notes

References

See also 
 Judiciary of Australia

 
Queensland
Supreme Court